The Costa Rican National Time Trial Championships are held annually to decide the cycling champions in the time trial, across various categories.

Men

Women

See also
Costa Rican National Road Race Championships

References

National road cycling championships
Cycle races in Costa Rica